Gunnar Pétursson (31 March 1930 – 4 May 2022) was an Icelandic cross-country skier who competed in the 1950s. He finished 32nd in the 18 km event at the 1952 Winter Olympics in Oslo where he was one of five skiers from Skutulsfjörður who competed at the games. He later competed several times in the Vasaloppet.

Personal life
Gunnar was born in Brautarholt, Skutulsfjörður in the Westfjords of Iceland. He was the brother of cross-country skier Oddur Pétursson who competed at the 1952 and 1956 Winter Olympics.

Gunnar died in the nursing home Eyri in Ísafjörður on 4 May 2022.

References

External links
 Olympedia profile
18 km Olympic cross country results: 1948-52

1930 births
Living people
Gunnar Petursson
Cross-country skiers at the 1952 Winter Olympics
Gunnar Petursson
Gunnar Petursson
20th-century Icelandic people